The following is a list of the Episcopal Church cathedrals in the United States  and its territories.  The dioceses are grouped into nine provinces, the first eight of which, for the most part, correspond to regions of the United States. Province IX is composed of dioceses in Latin America.  The see city usually has a cathedral, often the oldest parish in that city, but some dioceses do not have a cathedral. The dioceses of Iowa and Minnesota each have two cathedrals.



Provinces, Dioceses and Cathedrals

See also
 List of Episcopal bishops of the United States

External links
 Episcopal Church website

Episcopal cathedrals in the United States
United States, Episcopal
Epsicopal cathedrals